Anoche is the eighth studio album by Argentine rock band Babasónicos. The album was composed in Córdoba in March 2005, and then recorded and produced by Andrew Weiss, as well as by the band themselves, in May 2005.

Track listing 
 "Así se habla" (That's What I'm Talking About) – 2:01
 "Carismático" (Charismatic) – 2:36
 "Yegua" (Mare) – 2:29
 "Un flash" (A Flash) – 2:27
 "Pobre duende" (Poor Goblin) – 1:23
 "Solita" (Alone - famine -) – 2:31
 "Puesto" (High) – 3:26
 "Falsario" (Fakeness) – 2:39
 "Capricho" (Whim) – 2:38
 "El colmo" (The Last Straw) – 2:40
 "Ciegos por el diezmo" (Blinded by the Tithe) – 2:57
 "Exámenes" (Exams) – 3:25
 "Muñeco" (Doll) – 2:25
 "Luces" (Lights) – 2:40

Singles 

 "Carismático"
 "Yegua"
 "El Colmo"
 "Capricho"
 "Puesto"

Sales and certifications

Personnel

Babasónicos 
 Adrián Dárgelos – vocals
 Diego Castellano – drums, percussion
 Mariano Roger – guitars, backing vocals
 Diego Rodríguez – guitars, backing vocals
 Gabriel Manelli – bass
 Diego Tuñón – keyboards, samples, backing vocals

Additional musicians 
 Carca (on the track "Falsario")

References 

2005 albums
Babasónicos albums